Samuel Point (Nos Samuil \'nos sa-mu-'il\) is on the coast of Bransfield Strait forming the southwest side of the entrance to Brunow Bay on Livingston Island in the South Shetland Islands, Antarctica.  The point is situated on the east side of Rozhen Peninsula, surmounted by Needle Peak (370 m), a conspicuous offshoot of Friesland Ridge. Opitsvet Lake lies at the point's base.

The feature is named after Czar Samuil of Bulgaria, 980-1014 AD.

Location

Maps
 L.L. Ivanov et al. Antarctica: Livingston Island and Greenwich Island, South Shetland Islands. Scale 1:100000 topographic map. Sofia: Antarctic Place-names Commission of Bulgaria, 2005.
 L.L. Ivanov. Antarctica: Livingston Island and Greenwich, Robert, Snow and Smith Islands. Scale 1:120000 topographic map.  Troyan: Manfred Wörner Foundation, 2009.

References
 Samuel Point. SCAR Composite Antarctic Gazetteer
 Bulgarian Antarctic Gazetteer. Antarctic Place-names Commission. (details in Bulgarian, basic data in English)

External links
 Samuel Point. Adjusted Copernix satellite image

Headlands of Livingston Island